Pterostylis commutata, commonly known as the midland rustyhood is a plant in the orchid family Orchidaceae and is endemic to Tasmania. It has a rosette of leaves near its base and up to five translucent white and green flowers with a hairy, insect-like labellum. It is only found in a small area near Tunbridge and Ross .

Description
Pterostylis commutata is a terrestrial,  perennial, deciduous, herb with an underground tuber and a rosette of between six and ten leaves. Flowering plants have a rosette at the base of the flowering stem but these are usually withered by flowering time. The flowers lean forward slightly and there are three or four stem leaves wrapped around the flowering stem. The lateral sepals are the same width as the galea, dished and have densely hairy edges. The edges of the labellum are wavy, with short, bristly hairs and there are two longer bristles near the "head" end. Flowering occurs from December to January.

Taxonomy and naming
Pterostylis commutata was first formally described in 1993 by David Jones from a specimen collected near Ross and the description was published in Muelleria. The specific epithet (commutata) is derived from the Latin word commutatus, 'changed', referring to the divergence of this species following isolation from related species.

Distribution and habitat
The midlands rustyhood grows in grassy woodland near Tunbridge and Ross.

Conservation
Pterostylis commutata is listed as "critically endangered" under the (CR) under the Environment Protection and Biodiversity Conservation Act 1999 (EPBC Act) and as "endangered" under the Tasmanian Government Threatened Species Protection Act 1995. The main threats to the species' survival include agricultural activities, habitat alteration and weed invasion.

References

commutata
Orchids of Tasmania
Plants described in 1993